Bytva ekstrasensiv is a reality TV series on the STB network in Ukraine. The show originated in the UK with the title Britain's Psychic Challenge. The first release of the first season was aired on October 28, 2007. It is now airing its 21st season.

Such programs show in the USA (America's Psychic Challenge), Azerbaijan, RF, Australia (The One), Kazakhstan, Lithuania, Estonia, and Latvia.

Series overviews

Season 15

Season 16

Season 17

Season 18

Season 19

References

Paranormal reality television series
2000s Ukrainian television series debuts
STB (TV channel) original programming